Infected Mushroom is an Israeli musical duo formed in Haifa in 1996 by producers Erez Eisen and Amit Duvdevani. They produce and perform psytrance, electronica, dream trance and psychedelic music. They are one of the best-selling groups in Israeli music history in terms of both domestic and international sales.

They employ a variety of musical sources, including acoustic guitars and complex synthesized basses. Their compositions often contain changes of drum beat and tempo. Infected Mushroom's live shows feature vocals and analogue instruments in performances that are set against a multimedia backdrop.

Members 

Erez Eisen was born on 8 September 1980 in Qiryat Yam, Israel. He began classical musical training at a young age, learning to play the organ at the age of four and studying classical piano at the Haifa Conservatory from the age of eight. Eisen became involved with computerized music at age 11, beginning with Impulse Tracker and later moving to more advanced musical composition software.

Eisen had collaborated with DJ Jörg and other notable psytrance artists by the age of 18, and has released three albums and many singles under other psytrance monikers, including Shidapu and Shiva Shidapu.

Amit Duvdevani was born on 7 November 1974 in Israel and has a similar musical background as Eisen. He started to play classical piano at age seven and continued to do so for nine years. He then progressed to heavy metal music and punk rock. Duvdevani played keyboards and wrote most of the material for the Haifa punk rock band Enzyme—he attended his first trance party in 1991.

Duvdevani was conscripted into the Israel Defense Forces, where he was first nicknamed, "Duvdev". After he finished his conscription in Israel, Duvdevani lived in India for a year, primarily in the Indian state of Goa. Duvdevani later collaborated with a member of Shiva Shidapu on four tracks, but they were never released.

Career

1996–2004: First four studio albums 
Eisen and Duvdevani first began to play together in 1996. A few of their early efforts were released under the name Shidapu & Duvdev. The duo then renamed themselves Infected Mushroom, a name they stole from a local punk band that had been disbanded. The young duo drew inspiration from The Prodigy and Metallica. In an interview with Psychedelic Magazine, the duo stated they were naturally attracted to the psytrance genre through its popularity. In 1998 the group began work on their first album, 1999's The Gathering, inspired by Simon Posford, X-Dream and Transwave. This album featured a dark, rhythmic sonic atmosphere exemplified by its popular track, "Psycho", using a sample from the movie Batman & Robin. It was one of the first albums to bring  to mainstream audiences, and contributed to the genre's worldwide popularity.

Their 2000 album, Classical Mushroom, contained "Bust a Move". The album is commonly referred to as one of the group's best efforts, one in which they continued their sonic evolution, and it remains one of the best-known albums in the genre.

The duo's 2001 B.P. Empire is notable for the musical epic "Dancing with Kadafi", which segues numerous styles of music, most notably through middle-eastern style melodies and a classical break which showcases Erez and Amit's piano skills. The name "Dancing with Kadafi" may be a reference to Erez's cat, who was named Kadafi.

Converting Vegetarians (2003), was a two-disc set. The 'Trance Side' disc contained trance-like dancefloor material comparable to their earlier work, while the disc entitled 'The Other Side' contained genre-bending experimental music. 'The Other Side' included Duvdev's vocal debut on the title track, the down-tempo "Elation Station", and the electro-pop tracks "Blink" and "Illuminaughty".

2004–2007: IM the Supervisor and increasing popularity 
The 2004 release of IM The Supervisor, continued to mix psytrance with other musical genres and became Infected Mushroom's best-selling album to date. It was psychedelic in a way that dance music rarely had been prior to its release. Certain parts of IM The Supervisor, most notably the gamelan-like noises, cut-up samples, and the old-school sequencer throb of "Bombat," were lauded as innovative at the time.

Infected Mushroom rose to #9 in the influential DJmag Top 100 DJs poll and were the highest placed psytrance DJs in the category's 2007 debut appearance, a reflection of the role the group had played in the genre's increased worldwide popularity.

2007–2012: Vicious Delicious and Legend of the Black Shawarma 

Vicious Delicious, considered by some as their most diverse musical effort up until that point, was released in 2007. The album includes "Becoming Insane"—a Spanish-guitar-led track containing Spanish lyrics—a collaboration with Gil Cerezo of the Mexican band Kinky, and the hip hop-influenced "Artillery" featuring rappers Swollen Members. The overall album features more guest vocalists than previous albums, as well as live guitars and drums.

Legend of the Black Shawarma was released in 2009. It includes a remix of The Doors song "Riders on the Storm", and continues the stylistic variety and use of guest vocalists. The album title refers to an Australian who wanted to go to sea in a shark-proof cage and was told that he would seem like "black shawarma", a West Asian delicacy, to the sharks. The success of Legend of the Black Shawarma led to a three-year tour.

2012–2015: Army of Mushrooms and Friends on Mushrooms 
The band's album, Army of Mushrooms, was released on 8 May 2012 on the Dim Mak Records label. It features tracks influenced by the psychedelic trance, dubstep, house and drum and bass genres, such as the up-tempo, breakbeat track "The Rat". The album includes a cover of "The Pretender" by the Foo Fighters, the progressive heavy-hitter "Drum n' Bassa" and "Nation of Wusses"—released as a single on 3 April 2012—and "U R So Fucked", released as a single/video on 14 February 2012.

A large-scale North American tour was launched on 12 May 2012, called "The Unveiling", and featured revamped stage production and novel audio/visual live aspects. The new live production featured Erez and Duvdev within two specially designed hollow spheres placed on stage, among other high tech additions to the band's live set-up and multimedia backdrop.

January 2013 saw the duo embark on their FungusAmongUS tour across North America, with special guests The M Machine. The "FungusAmongUS" tour was designed by Vita Motus and V Squared Labs, the creators of Amon Tobin's ISAM production and Skrillex's live Cell production.

The duo released a collaborative EP named Friends on Mushrooms Vol. 1 in January 2013, again under Dim Mak Records. The EP consists of tracks featuring Astrix and Hatikva 6. In July 2013, the duo released Friends on Mushrooms Vol. 2, also under Dim Mak Records, which consisted of collaborations with Pegboard Nerds, Savant and Kelsy Karter. In mid-2013, Infected Mushroom embarked on a tour in support of the Vol. 2 release that featured the duo "set against an incredible three dimensional landscape that brings INFECTED MUSHROOM's visual and sonic journey to life."

In August 2013, due to the leaked song "Aura", Infected Mushroom was revealed as a production team on Lady Gaga's third studio album Artpop. Friends on Mushrooms Vol. 3 was released on 17 June 2014 and includes a collaboration with Savant.

On 1 April 2014, Duvdevani said that Infected Mushroom will be releasing a new album at the end of the year. It was later revealed that Infected Mushroom will in fact be releasing a compilation of the tracks from the Friends On Mushrooms extended plays, bundled together with two new tracks, "Kafkaf" and "Kazabubu". This was released on 6 January 2015.

2015–2018: Converting Vegetarians II, Return to the Sauce, and Monstercat  

Following their Animatronica tour, the band officially announced that their new album will be a follow up to their widely acclaimed Converting Vegetarians album of 2003, sporting the same name. Additionally, it has been announced that the vocals of Sasha Grey will be featured in the track Fields of Grey. The album was released on 11 September 2015.

On 27 January 2017, the band released their eleventh studio album, Return to the Sauce, which features their signature psy-trance sound.  This is in stark contrast to Converting Vegetarians II, which is more ambient and down-tempo in style.  The release of Return to the Sauce was preceded by two singles, "Liquid Smoke" and "Nutmeg".

On 24 November 2017, the band released their single Spitfire on the Canadian independent record label Monstercat.

2018–present: IM21 Pt.1, and Head of NASA and the 2 Amish Boys 
On 9 March 2018, the band released IM21, Pt.1 under the label Hommega. It is composed of remixes of "Bust a Move", "Suliman", "Saeed", "Yamakas in space", and an acoustic live remix of "i-Wish". These were remixed by groups such as Bliss, No Comment, Paranormal Attack and Modulation. The acoustic remix of "i-Wish" was done by the band itself.

On 30 October 2018, the band announced a new full-length album titled Head of NASA and the 2 Amish Boys. The album was released through Monstercat on 12 December that same year. There are seven tracks on the album which are mainly electronic with psytrance influences and include one hip-hop collaboration song with Israeli artist Tuna and Israeli girl band A-WA in Hebrew, Arabic and English – Lost in Space.

In 2020, the group released their 12th album More Than Just a Name. It features collaborations with Astrix and Bliss. The track Infected Megamix features a montage of past popular Infected Mushroom songs.

On July 7, 2022, Infected Mushroom released the single "A Cookie from Space", announced to be the first single from their 25-year anniversary album, IM25.

Touring 
On average, the band completes 120 live annual performances, including the Ultra Music Festival in Miami, US; the Virgin Festival in Baltimore, US; Mexico's OMIX; California, US' Coachella Valley Music and Arts Festival; Brazil's Ipanema Beach; Melbourne, Australia's Metro Club; and the 2009, 2011, 2014, 2016, and 2022 Burning Man Festivals in Black Rock City, Nevada, US. Infected Mushroom have been twice ranked amongst the world's "10 Best DJ's" by readers of U.K.'s DJ Magazine.

Discography 

 The Gathering (1999)
 Classical Mushroom (2000)
 B.P. Empire (2001)
 Converting Vegetarians (2003)
 IM the Supervisor (2004)
 Vicious Delicious (2007)
 Legend of the Black Shawarma (2009)
 Army of Mushrooms (2012)
 Converting Vegetarians II (2015)
 Return to the Sauce (2017)
 Head of NASA and the 2 Amish Boys (2018)
 More than Just a Name (2020)
 IM25 (2022)

References

External links 

 Official website

Electronic music duos
Goa trance musicians
Israeli electronic musicians
Israeli electronic music groups
Israeli psychedelic trance musicians
Musical groups established in 1996
Musical groups from Haifa
Monstercat artists
Dim Mak Records artists
Psychedelic trance musical groups
Tracker musicians
Israeli musical duos